Ingress (or Ingress: The Animation) is a Japanese anime television series based on Niantic's augmented reality mobile game of the same name. The anime produced by Craftar began airing in Japan on October 18, 2018 and ended on December 27, 2018 on Fuji TV's +Ultra programming block (although the last episode’s post credit scene foreshadows that the series is “to be continued”). The series premiered on Netflix on April 30, 2019.

Plot
The story follows special police investigator Makoto, who has the power to read the memories of objects he touches. While investigating a laboratory explosion that was researching an unknown substance called "Exotic Matter" (XM), he touches the ring of a woman who was the sole survivor of the explosion and sees a horrifying vision that embroils him in a massive conspiracy.

Characters
 
 
 A special investigator employed by the Metropolitan Police Force, Makoto is gifted with psychometry, which allows him to read the memories of objects he touches.

 
 
 The sole survivor of an explosion at a research lab that was studying the substance XM. Sarah has lost her memories and appears to have mutual feelings for Makoto.

 
 
 A former mercenary who is following Sarah. Jack has the ability called "Flash Forward" that allows him to see into the future.

 
 
 A scientist who hires Jack as a bodyguard. 

 
 
 Head of security at the research lab where the explosion occurred, Liu has taken a particular interest in Makoto. He is revealed to be working with Brandt.

 
 
 Makoto's friend who specializes in forged public documents.

 
 
 An archaeologist who is conducting research on a special "power spot" that may be connected to XM.

 
 
 ADA, short for A Detection Algorithm, is an artificial intelligence developed by the Niantic Project researchers to assist in their research of XM. However, after being exposed to the XM, it becomes self-aware.

Production
The animated series was produced by Craftar under the direction of Yūhei Sakuragi with scripts composed by Sōki Tsukishima, Tora Tsukishima, and Sō Akasaka. The series premiered in Japan on Fuji TV's +Ultra anime programming block on October 18, 2018 with additional broadcasts by Kansai TV, Tokai TV, TNC, UHB, and BS Fuji. Netflix initially announced that it would stream the series worldwide on November 23, 2018 but rescheduled it to April 30, 2019.

The opening theme song for Ingress: The Animation is Alt-J's "Tessellate".

The ending theme song for Ingress: The Animation is Alt-J's "In Cold Blood".

Episode list

Notes

References

External links
 
 Ingress: The Animation on Netflix
 

+Ultra
2018 anime television series debuts
Anime television series based on video games
Fuji TV original programming
Netflix original anime